Joseph Roger Seneviratne (born 5 May 1962 as රොජර් සෙනෙවිරත්න) [Sinhala]), is an actor in Sri Lankan cinema, stage drama and television as well as singer and politician by profession. Highly versatile actor who dominated television screen, he is best known for the roles in teledrama Batti, Chathurya and as King Vijaya in film Vijaya Kuweni.

Personal life
He is a past pupil of St. Thomas' College, Kotte and Saint Joseph's College, Colombo. He is married to Vineetha Chandrasekara and the couple has one daughter Divya Vihari and one son Digantha.

His father Riyency Steinwall Seneviratne was a retired officer in Sri Lanka Ports Authority. He died in 2012 at the age of 84. Roger is the second of the family with nine siblings. His elder brother is Ralston and younger brother is Ralph. He has six sisters, Kristine, Darliya, Sharmane, Linet, Michel and Virginia.

Acting career
His acting career started in 1976 when his friend Milton Jayasooriya introduced him to dramatist Sugathapala de Silva. He acted in de Silva's stage play Dunna Dunu Gamuwe and also worked as assistant stage manager of that play. Then he continued to act in stage plays such as Ediriweera Sarachchandra's Wessanthara, Veniceye Welenda, Twelfth Night and Mandaram Wehi. In 1986, he made a short play by translating Anton Chekhov's play Death of a Clerk as an experimental production. Then he translated Albert Kaman’s Caligula as Paswenna. The drama won eleven awards at the drama competition conducted by the National Youth Services Council. In 1993, Paswenna won awards for the best director and best production at the State Drama Festival.

Seneviratne also involved for international collaborations such as Italian productions Return to Bangalore Mother Theresa and French production Father Mannika.

His cinema career started in 1981 with a short film Parajithayo directed by Prasanna Amarasinghe. His maiden cinema appearance came through Christu Charithaya directed by Sunil Ariyaratne with a minor role. In 2001, he produced the television serial Santhrasaya which achieved the best rating for ITN in that year. His second production came through blockbuster hit Chathurya. His maiden television drama acting came through Irata Handana Mal. Under his production company 2R Creations, Seneviratne produced the television serials such as Ranarala and Wijayaba Kollaya.

Notable theater works

 Dunna Dunu Gamuwe
 Wessanthara
 Veniceye Welenda
 Twelfth Night
 Mandaram Wehi
 Paswenna
 Spartacus
 Avamanawa
 Men with Shadows
 Romaya Gini Gani 2

Notable television works

 Ada Sihinaya
 Ahanna Kenek Na
 Aparna
  Asirimath Daladagamanaya
 Athuru Paara
 Batti
 Chakraudhaya 
 Charithayaka Paata Denna
 Chathurya
 Dahas Gawdura
 Damini
 Denuwara Manike 
 Dhawala Kanya
 Diya Matha Liyami
 Doratu Rakinno 
 Dumriya Andaraya 
 Ektam Ge
 Gajaman Nona
 Gini Dalu Meda
 Ingammaruwa
 Irata Handana Mal
 Kammiththa
 Kinduru Nadiya
 Kulavilokanaya
 Kulawanthayo
 Mindada
 Nadunana Puththu
 Nil Mal Viyana 
 Nisala Diya Sasala Viya
 Once Upon a Time in Colombo
 Pata Veeduru
 Ranarala
 Ran Bedi Minissu
 Sakisanda Suwaris
 Samanalayano
 Samudra Chaya
 Santhrase
 Satya 
 Senuri
 Sudu Mal Kanda
 Ulamage Rathriya
 Wanabime Sirakaruwo
 Wara Mal
 Wijayaba Kollaya

Beyond acting
He entered politics in 1978 when University of Peradeniya started a riot campaign to protest against White Paper introduced by the Education Department. 
He was a former councilor of the Western Provincial Council representing the National Freedom Front (NFF) in 2009. He resigned from the post in 2018. In 2014, he contested from United People’s Freedom alliance for the Western Province Council under United People’s Freedom Alliance. He took 44,011 votes and selected as a councilor for Western provincial council.

In 1986, he worked at Rupavahini Corporation to perform documentaries Ruwan Wassa and Diriya Duwa. Then he worked with Darmasena Pathiraja’s Nadunana Puthu.

Arrest
In January 2002, Seneviratne assaulted with a club and caused injuries to Jayantha Mihira Wickremarachchi at Kalalgoda Road in Pannipitiya. Due to the assault, his leg fractured in three places. The rival initiated when Jayantha's wife befriended with Seneviratne and left him. She went live with Seneviratne in a house at Kalalgoda Road. The assault took place, when Jayantha went to that home to meet his wife. Seneviratne was accused had committed an offense under Section 317 of the Penal Code and arrested. After he fount to be guilty, Kaduwela magistrate sentenced Seneviratne to one year’s rigorous imprisonment. In 2014, Seneviratne was sentenced to two years rigorous imprisonment suspended for five years by Avissawella Magistrate.

In 2018, Seneviratne appeared before 12 June 2018 on Colombo Chief Magistrate's Court with other member of National Freedom Front. The case was filed against inconveniencing the public by protesting against the arrival of the United Nations Human Rights Commissioner Prince Zeid Raad Al Hussein outside the UN complex in Thunmulla in 2016.

Filmography

Awards and accolades
He has won several awards for the Best Actor, Supporting Actor and Popular Actor in many local television and theater award festivals.

Sumathi Awards

|-
|| 1996 ||| Nadunana Puththu || Merit Award || 
|-
|| 2008 ||| Wanabime Sirakaruwa || Best Actor ||

References

External links
 Chaotic celebrations after SC verdict on dissolution of Parliament
 Interview with Roger Seneviratne
 Eye clinic and blood donation
 Gammanpila & Roger already bootless
 ‘My aim is to rank among the top three’
 Political parties bracing for election campaigns

Sri Lankan male film actors
Living people
1962 births